Sebastian Madera (born May 30, 1985) is a Polish footballer who is currently a free agent. Throughout his career, he suffered many injuries.

Career

Club
In 2006, he was loaned to KKS Koluszki. For 2008-2009 season, Madera was loaned to Tur Turek. In February 2012, he moved from Widzew Łódź to Ekstraklasa club Lechia Gdańsk on a loan deal until the end of the 2011-12 season. After a loan spell, he joined Lechia Gdańsk in a permanent deal.

On 24 June 2014 he signed with Jagiellonia Białystok.

References

External links
  
 

1985 births
Living people
People from Rawicz
Sportspeople from Greater Poland Voivodeship
Polish footballers
Miedź Legnica players
Widzew Łódź players
Tur Turek players
Lechia Gdańsk players
Jagiellonia Białystok players
Zagłębie Lubin players
Ekstraklasa players
Association football defenders